The Goldwyn Girls were a musical stock company of female dancers employed by Samuel Goldwyn. Famous actresses, dancers, and models whose career included a stint in the Goldwyn Girls include Lucille Ball, Virginia Bruce, Claire Dodd, Paulette Goddard, Betty Grable, Virginia Grey, Lorraine Crawford, Jann Darlyn, Barbara Brent, Madelyn Darrow, June Kirby, Joi Lansing, Barbara Pepper, Marjorie Reynolds, Pat Sheehan, Gail Sheridan, Ann Sothern, Larri Thomas, Tyra Vaughn, Toby Wing, and Jane Wyman.

History 
Samuel Goldwyn modeled his silver screen Goldwyn Girls after the stage sensation Ziegfeld Follies around 1929 when Ziegfeld came west to Hollywood to assist in the film production of his popular musical Whoopee!. Goldwyn learned much from Florenz Ziegfeld on creating an enchanting chorus line, one of which Ziegfeld called his secrets of success: "Women enjoyed looking at beautiful women in beautiful clothes, the glorification of their gender". To this standard, Goldwyn added his own guidelines, explaining to the press that a Goldwyn Girl must meet his standards of beauty, personality, talent, self-confidence, and ambition. He is quoted as requiring one more ethereal trait as well, "I have always insisted that every Goldwyn Girl look as though she had just stepped out of a bathtub. There must be a kind of a radiant scrubbed cleanliness about them which rules out all artificiality."

One use for the dynamic chorus line, the Goldwyn Girls, was to open Goldwyn's Cantor productions. The pictures, built on a stock formula, would inevitably open with a big production number of the Goldwyn Girls, then move to a blackface number, and end happily for the characters. Two such productions were Whoopee! and Palmy Days.

In 1955, MGM Studios produced a film rendition of the popular Broadway musical Guys and Dolls, with a new line of Goldwyn Girls cast as the Hotbox Dancers, supporting Vivian Blaine as Miss Adelaide, who originated the role on Broadway. The Goldwyn Girls then went on a world tour, which further promoted the film, and the film became an international hit, "rivaling MGM's overseas records set by Gone With the Wind".

Partial filmography
 1930: Whoopee!
 1931: Palmy Days
 1931: Kiki
 1932: The Kid from Spain
 1933: Roman Scandals
 1934: Kid Millions
 1936: Strike Me Pink
 1938: The Goldwyn Follies
 1944: Up in Arms
 1944: The Princess and the Pirate
 1945: Wonder Man
 1946: The Kid from Brooklyn
 1947: The Secret Life of Walter Mitty
 1955: Guys and Dolls, as the Hot Box Girls

References

External links

 Dancer History Archives